Jonathan Adam Holland (born September 14, 1971) is an American rower. He competed in the men's coxless pair event at the 1996 Summer Olympics.  He graduated from Harvard University.

References

External links
 

1971 births
Living people
American male rowers
Olympic rowers of the United States
Rowers at the 1996 Summer Olympics
Rowers from Philadelphia
Harvard Crimson rowers